Emin Çölaşan (born 14 March 1942) is a Turkish investigative journalist, whose daily column appeared in the  mass-circulation newspaper, Istanbul-based Hürriyet, for 22 years, from 1985 to 2007. Since 2007, he continues his column in Sözcü.

Family background
A native of Ankara, Emin Çölaşan was born into a Cretan Turkish family whose surname, which literally means "desert strider", is a reference to his grandfather who was exiled by Sultan Abdülhamid II deep into the Fizan desert interior of Libya for 7 years because of taking part in the Young Turk movement.  His maternal grandfather, Refik Şevket İnce, born in Polichnitos near Mytilene (modern-day Greek island of Lesbos), served under the country's leader, Mustafa Kemal Atatürk and, subsequently, in ministerial posts during the 1920s and into the 1950s, and his father served in the State Meteorological Service where he was a general director for 14 years, one of the longest. His wife Tansel (born 1943), who held the position of chief advocate for the Turkish Council of State (Danıştay), was the president of Atatürk Thought Association. He has no children.

Education and career
Çölaşan finished his secondary studies in TED Ankara College and graduated from the Middle East Technical University with a degree in management studies. For a decade, he worked in various public institutions and started his journalism career in 1977 at the Istanbul daily Milliyet, shifting in 1985 as a regular columnist for Hürriyet, an influential position which he has maintained for nearly a quarter of a century.  He is also the author of numerous books which focus primarily on malpractices within governmental and public circles in Turkey, as well as an instigator and/or party in frequent polemics centering on his discoveries of official malfeasance and misconduct.

Controversies 
Çölaşan had been a critic of Turgut Özal, Turkey's Prime Minister from 1983 to 1989, who became the target of his 1980s bestseller books Turgut'un Serüveni [Turgut's Adventure] and Turgut Nereden Koşuyor? [Where is Turgut Running From?].  Çölaşan also criticized the incumbent AKP government, which is known to be the reason behind his 13 August 2007 firing from Hürriyet after 22 years of service. 
A strong and passionate nationalist, Çölaşan has criticized the government's plans regarding the Kurdish problem. Emin Çölaşan is a secularist, has accused the AKP government for Islamism.

Works 
 24 Ocak Bir Dönemin Perde Arkası, 1983 - Series
 12 Eylül Özal Ekonomisinin Perde Arkası, 1984 - Series
 Yalçın'ı Kim Kurtaracak?, 1985
 Yalçın Nereye Koşuyor, 1985
 Banker Skandalı'nın Perde Arkası, 1985
 İcraatın İçinden, 1986 - Interview
 Önce İnsanım Sonra Gazeteci, 1987
 Biz Kırk Kişiyiz Birbirimizi Biliriz, 1987 - Interview
 Turgut Nereden Koşuyor?, Tekin Yayınevi, İstanbul, 1989
 Bir Dönemin Yazıları 1988-1989, Tekin Yayınevi, 1990, 
 Turgut'un Serüveni, Tekin Yayınevi, İstanbul, 1993, 
 Sor Bakalım!, Tekin Yayınevi, İstanbul, 1993,  - Interview
 Muhteşem İkili, Ümit Yayıncılık, Ankara, 1998, 
 Ah Refah Vah Refah, Ümit Yayıncılık, Ankara, 1998, 
 Tarihe Düşülen Notlar, Ümit Yayıncılık, Ankara, 2000, 
 Unutulmayan Söyleşiler Tarihe Düşülen Notlar, 2006
 Şu Benim Gazetecilik "Yaşadıklarım", Doğan Kitap, 2005, 
 Kovulduk Ey Halkım Unutma Bizi, Bilgi Yayınevi, 2007 
 Her Kuşun Eti Yenmez, Bilgi Yayınevi 2008 
 Sakıncalı Gazeteci, Bilgi Yayınevi 2009

References

Notes

External links
 Archive of articles by Emin Çölaşan

1942 births
Living people
People from Ankara
Turkish journalists
Turkish writers
Turkish columnists
Turkish secularists
TED Ankara College Foundation Schools alumni
Middle East Technical University alumni
Sözcü people
Hürriyet people
Milliyet people